Debra Allbery (born March 3, 1957 in Lancaster, Ohio) is an American poet.

Life
Allbery is an Ohio native, though she currently lives in Fairview, North Carolina. She has graduated from College of Wooster, University of Virginia, and University of Iowa, has taught at Dickinson College, Randolph College, the University of Michigan, and is the Director of the MFA Program for Writers at Warren Wilson College, where she's been on the poetry faculty since 1983.

Her work has appeared in Crazy Horse, The Missouri Review, Ironwood, Iowa Review, Poetry, Ploughshares, TriQuarterly, The Kenyon Review, and The Yale Review, and she is among the poets included in The Broadview Anthology of Poetry, edited by Herbert Rosengarten and Amanda Goldrick-Jones.

Awards
 1990 Agnes Lynch Starrett Poetry Prize for Walking Distance
 1994 Sherwood Anderson Fellowship
 Two NEA fellowships
 "Discovery"/The Nation prize.

Works

Poetry

Essays

References

External links
.

1957 births
Agnes Lynch Starrett Poetry Prize winners
American women poets
College of Wooster alumni
University of Virginia alumni
University of Iowa alumni
Warren Wilson College faculty
Dickinson College faculty
Randolph College faculty
University of Michigan faculty
Living people
American women academics
21st-century American women